See you next Tuesday (C U Next Tuesday) is a common euphemistic backronym for the word "cunt", an alternative version swapping in 'Thursday,'  and can also refer to:

See You Next Tuesday (band), an experimental deathcore band
See You Next Tuesday (album), the second album by hip hop group FannyPack
See You Next Tuesday (film), a 2013 independent film by Drew Tobia
"See You Next Tuesday", a song by deathcore band The Acacia Strain that appears on their 2006 album The Dead Walk
"C U Next Tuesday", a song by Kesha from the 2010 EP Cannibal
"C U Next Tuesday", a song by Shakespears Sister from the 2019 compilation Singles Party
"Seeya", a song by electronic musician Deadmau5 from the 2014 album while(1<2), based on an earlier instrumental titled "Seeya Next Tuesday

See also
See You Next Wednesday

In-jokes